The Best American Science and Nature Writing is a yearly anthology of popular science magazine articles published in the United States.  It was started in 2000 and is part of The Best American Series published by Houghton Mifflin. Articles are chosen using the same procedure with other titles in the Best American series; the series editor chooses about 100 article candidates, from which the guest editor picks 25 or so for publication; the remaining runner-up articles listed in the appendix. 

Burkhard Bilger was the series editor for 2000 and 2001. Tim Folger was the series editor from 2002 to 2018. Jaime Green has been the series editor since 2019.

Guest editors
 2000: David Quammen
 2001: Edward O. Wilson
 2002: Natalie Angier
 2003: Richard Dawkins
 2004: Steven Pinker
 2005: Jonathan Weiner
 2006: Brian Greene
 2007: Richard Preston
 2008: Jerome Groopman
 2009: Elizabeth Kolbert
 2010: Freeman Dyson
 2011: Mary Roach
 2012: Dan Ariely
 2013: Siddhartha Mukherjee
 2014: Deborah Blum
 2015: Rebecca Skloot 
 2016: Amy Stewart
 2017: Hope Jahren
 2018: Sam Kean
 2019: Sy Montgomery
 2020: Michio Kaku
 2021: Ed Yong
 2022: Ayana Elizabeth Johnson

See also
The Best American Science Writing

External links
Online Index to The Best American Science and Nature Writing Series

Book series introduced in 2000
Science And Nature Writing
Houghton Mifflin books